Shekar Daraq is a village in Molla Yaqub Rural District, in the Central District of Sarab County, East Azerbaijan Province, Iran. At the 2006 census, its population was 18, in 7 families.

References 

Populated places in Sarab County